Nick Schifrin (born July 10, 1980) is an American journalist. He is the PBS NewsHour foreign affairs and defense correspondent. He was previously Al Jazeera America's Middle East correspondent and a correspondent for ABC News in London and in Afghanistan/Pakistan.

Early life and education
Schifrin grew up in Los Angeles, California. He graduated from Columbia University. During his time at Columbia, Schifrin served as managing editor of The Columbia Daily Spectator.

ABC News
In 2002 Schifrin joined ABC News as an overnight desk assistant.

In 2006, Schifrin helped launch the daily World News Webcast, the first network show designed for the web and iTunes. He served as the show's writer and broadcast producer. In its review of the webcast, The New York Times called the show's stories "raw and personal, as if they were made for MTV rather than ABC".

In 2007, Schifrin moved to New Delhi, India, where he served as an ABC News reporter. There, he interviewed the Dalai Lama during the 2008 Tibetan unrest, and won a Business Emmy as part of a team covering the worldwide food crisis. Schifrin was also one of the first international reporters to arrive on the scene following the November 2008 Mumbai attacks.

In 2008, Schifrin became the ABC News Afghanistan/Pakistan correspondent and bureau chief. Schifrin was one of the first journalists to arrive in Abbottabad, Pakistan after Osama bin Laden's death in 2011, delivering one of biggest exclusives of the year: the first video from inside bin Laden's compound. His reporting helped ABC News win an Edward R. Murrow Award for its bin Laden coverage.

In 2012, Schifrin moved to London, reporting on breaking news and feature stories across Europe and northern Africa.

Al Jazeera America
In November 2013, Schifrin became Al Jazeera America's first foreign correspondent. He was based in Jerusalem and primarily covered the Middle East.

In early 2014, Schifrin arrived in Ukraine as violence peaked in Kiev. He spent more than a month in Ukraine, including Crimea, as Ukraine's pro-Russian government fell and Russia annexed Crimea. He and his team won a National Headliners Award for their coverage.

In the summer of 2014, Schifrin led the channel's coverage of the war in Gaza. During this time he filed more than 50 stories from Gaza and Israel during the war, and anchored an hour-long special from Gaza City, reporting from inside Gaza longer than almost any other foreign journalist. Schifrin and his team won the Overseas Press Club's David Kaplan Award for their coverage of the war from both sides of the border.

PBS NewsHour
Schifrin was named PBS NewsHour foreign affairs and defense correspondent in May 2018. Beginning in late 2015, Schifrin was a PBS NewsHour special correspondent, creating week-long series: "Inside Putin's Russia"; NATO and Ukraine "Fault Lines"; "Nigeria: Pain and Promise"; "Egypt 5 Years On." Inside Putin's Russia won a 2018 Peabody Award and the 2018 National Press Club's Edwin M. Hood Award for Diplomatic Correspondence-broadcast. After the 10-part series "China: Power and Prosperity" in September 2019 and the "China: Power and Prosperity" documentary in July 2020, Schifrin received the American Academy of Diplomacy's Arthur Ross Media Award. In 2021, Schifrin was part of a team of correspondents and producers awarded a Peabody for coverage of the Covid-19 pandemic.

Publications
In 2011, Schifrin wrote "Reading Shakespeare In Kandahar", a piece based on his journey from his college lecture classroom, where he was on 9/11, to bin Laden's lair ten years later. In his class a decade prior, Schifrin's Shakespeare professor had given an emotional speech about the 9/11 attacks and Shakespeare's Titus Andronicus, with its theme of the desire for revenge. The piece touches on the US's failure to heed Shakespeare's warnings about how the pursuit of revenge can become destructive. "Reading Shakespeare In Kandahar" was published in Foreign Policy. Schifrin and his Columbia Professor, David Kastan, appeared on "Charlie Rose" to discuss the essay.

Awards
 Peabody Award: Coverage of the COVID-19 pandemic, June 2021 (shared with a team of correspondents and producers)
 American Academy of Diplomacy's Arthur Ross Media Award, November 2020
 National Press Club's Edwin M. Hood Award for Diplomatic Correspondence-broadcast, July 2018
 Peabody Award: Inside Putin's Russia, May 2018
Overseas Press Club's David Kaplan Award for "Conflict in Gaza", May 2015 
The Press Club of Atlantic City’s National Headliners Award for "Coverage of Ukraine", March 2015 
Radio Television Digital News Association’s Edward R. Murrow Award: Video Breaking News Coverage for "Target bin Laden: The Death of Public Enemy #1", March 2012 
Emmy Award: News & Documentary for Outstanding Live Coverage of a Current News Story – Long Form, December 2008

References

External links
 Nick Schifrin official website
 
 "Reading Shakespeare in Kandahar". ForeignPolicy.com. September 8, 2011. Retrieved July 9, 2015.

1980 births
Living people
American male journalists
Al Jazeera people
PBS people
Paul H. Nitze School of Advanced International Studies alumni
Columbia University alumni
21st-century American journalists